Moscardini is an Italian surname. Notable people with the surname include:

Carlos Moscardini (born 1959), Argentine composer and guitarist
Giovanni Moscardini (1897–1985), Italian-Scottish footballer
Lauro Moscardini (born 1961), Italian astrophysicist and cosmologist

Italian-language surnames